All Fours is the fourth studio album by American band Bosse-de-Nage. Released on April 14, 2015 by Profound Lore Records, the album was produced by Jack Shirley, who is known for his work for Deafheaven and Loma Prieta.

The album features a black metal and post-hardcore style infused with "mathy post-rock, shoegaze and screamo" elements, which drew comparisons to the works of Slint and Shirley in the post-hardcore genre. The vocalist Bryan Manning's sex-themed lyrics were also compared to the works of Pig Destroyer, Italo Calvino and Jorge Luis Borges.

Critical reception

The album generally received positive reviews from music critics. Decibel magazine critic Sean Frasier described the record as "a journey—ending with an ascent up “The Most Modern Staircase”—where vocalist/lyricist Bryan Manning challenges complacency and dismisses simple answers to difficult questions while sharing his darkest thoughts with teeth bare." Exclaim!s Michael Rancic praised the album, writing: "It's not just how many styles Bosse-De-Nage wield, but how and when they go about doing it, that proves them to be equally great songwriters and musicians and makes All Fours such an artful, smart and rewarding record."

The album was featured as number 13 on Pitchfork's list of "The Best Metal Albums of 2015."

Track listing
 "At Night" – 8:21
 "The Industry of Distance" – 5:57
 "-" – 2:04
 "A Subtle Change" – 5:52
 "Washerwoman" – 9:21
 "In a Yard Somewhere" – 5:45
 "To Fall Down" – 7:43
 "The Most Modern Staircase" – 9:48

Personnel
Bosse-de-Nage
 D. – bass guitar
 H. (Harry Cantwell) – drums
 B. (Bryan Manning) – vocals
 M. – guitar

Other personnel
 Jack Shirley – production, recording, mixing, mastering

References

External links
 

2015 albums
Profound Lore Records albums
Bosse-de-Nage albums
Albums produced by Jack Shirley
The Flenser albums